"Right Here, Right Now" is a song by British alternative dance band Jesus Jones from their second studio album, Doubt (1991). It was released as the album's second single on 24 September 1990. Although it spent only nine nonconsecutive weeks on the UK Singles Chart, peaking at number 31, it became a top-10 hit in the United States; it topped the Billboard Modern Rock Tracks chart and reached number two on the Billboard Hot 100 in July 1991. The single sold over one million copies, won a BMI award, and was the song most played on college radio in 1991.

Content
The song was inspired by the Revolutions of 1989 in Europe, particularly Perestroika in the Soviet Union. Mike Edwards has said that some of the lyrics were influenced by the band's experiences playing in Romania in February 1990 shortly after the overthrow of Nicolae Ceaușescu. The lyrics were also inspired by the 1987 Prince song "Sign o' the Times" and a 1989 cover version of it by Simple Minds, which the members of Jesus Jones had first heard during television coverage of the fall of the Berlin Wall. Edwards' original demo for "Right Here, Right Now" featured samples of the Prince song, as well as guitar solos by Jimi Hendrix, but producer Martyn Phillips removed both elements from the song before the band recorded it. 

The official video for the song shows the band performing on stage mixed with images from contemporary political events such as the fall of the Berlin Wall, news footage of the collapse of the Soviet Union and speeches by American and Soviet leaders.

Credits
 Produced by Martyn Phillips
 Recorded at Matrix Studios and Ezee Studios in London
 Engineer Darren Allison

Charts

Weekly charts

Year-end charts

Release history

Covers
A cover version was recorded by New Zealand band The Feelers and released as a single in 2010 and on the album Hope Nature Forgives. It was chosen as the anthem to the 2011 Rugby World Cup advertising campaign.

See also
 Number one modern rock hits of 1991

References

1990 singles
1990 songs
Anti-war songs
Cashbox number-one singles
EMI Records singles
Environmental songs
Food Records singles
Jesus Jones songs
SBK Records singles